Uncharacterized Protein C15orf32 is a protein which in humans is encoded by the C15orf32 gene and is located on chromosome 15, location 15q26.1. Variants of C15orf32 have been linked to bipolar disorder, alcohol use disorder, and acute myeloid leukemia.

Gene 
C15orf32, which stands for chromosome 15 open reading frame 32, is a gene on the plus strand of chromosome 15, on the cytogenetic band 15q26.1. C15orf32 is 29,464 bases long; on Genome Reference Consortium Human Build 38, it spans bases 92,471,654-92,501,117. It contains 3 exons.

Transcripts 
Two isoforms of C15orf32 exist. The longer transcript, known as transcript variant 2 on NCBI, is 1,764 bases long. The other is transcript 1 and is 1,726 bases long.

Proteins 
The transcript variant 2 of the C15orf32 gene encodes a 178 amino acid protein and has a molecular mass of 20,262 Da. Its basal isoelectric point is 9.34. Transcript variant 1 is missing amino acids 166–178. There is significantly large spacing between the glutamic acid residues at locations 12 and 23.

Structure 

A transmembrane segment is predicted between amino acids 51 and 71 by Phobius and amino acids 57 and 71 by SAPS. The N-terminus is predicted to be outside of the cytoplasm, and the C-terminus within the cytoplasm. The Chou-Fasman algorithm predicts a beta sheet in this region, as well as much of region between amino acids 114 and 147. I-TASSER was used to predict the tertiary structure. The top model predicted eight alpha helices, including one between amino acids 51 and 71 concurrent with the transmembrane segment predicted earlier, although this structure had low confidence.

Regulation

Gene level 
The promoter region of C15orf32 is predicted to span base pairs 92,470,677-92,471,777 according to Gene2Promoter tool by Genomatix. The most commonly predicted transcription factor families by the MatInspector tool from Genomatix within this promoter region were SOX, nuclear receptor subfamily 2, and retinoid X receptor. Transcription factor binding sites that have been determined experimentally include STAT1, MAFK, and JUND and are located within the second intron. C15orf32 is expressed most notably in testes, brain, heart, and early in the development of fetuses, although expression is very low. Exposure to some compounds such as bromelain, Bortezomib, estrogen, and 4-hydroxytamoxifen lead to increase in C15orf32 expression in breast cancer cells.

Transcript level 
Possible secondary structures of the 5' and 3' untranslated region in C15orf32 mRNA is given to the left and was predicted by mfold. It is mostly linear, with a number of small stem-loops. According to TargetScan, sites targeted by miRNA families miR-193a-5p and miR-365-3p within the 3' UTR are broadly conserved among vertebrates.

Protein level 
Immunohistochemical staining shows that C15orf32 is localized within cells to the cytoplasm and membranes, including the nucleus. Both PSORTII and DeepLoc strongly predict localization to the nucleus. Thr41 has been shown to be phosphorylated post-translation 26 other potential phosphorylation sites were predicted using NetPhos, with the most likely phosphorylation sites being 6S by PKC, 32T by PKG, 83T by PKC, 89S by PKC, and 162S by PKA. A sumoylation site is predicted at amino acids 107–110. 11 mucin type GalNAc O-glycosylation were predicted using NetOGlyc, 9 of which occurred in the first 50 base pairs.

Interactions 
Experimental evidence shows potential interaction between C15orf32 and PKD2, ALG9, DISP1, NPC1, FZD2, FAM69A, ATP6V1G2, ASIC1, DPY19L4, SPPL2B, and HGSNAT.

Clinical significance 
Variants of C15orf32 has been linked to several traits through genome wide association studies. The rs8040009 SNP in the 3’ UTR had a strong association with bipolar I disorder in a population of Han Chinese. Three SNPs within C15orf32, including rs1455773 in exon 1 which causes a missense mutation from alanine to threonine at position 17, were also associated with bipolar disorder in an Australian cohort. This SNP was also linked to alcohol use disorder and heaviness of drinking. The rs1455774 SNP, located in the 5’ UTR, is located within the target sites of miRNA has-miR-539 and has-let-7i* which affects the expression of these miRNAs, which may increase breast cancer susceptibility. The rs11635085 SNP was linked to increased antibody IgG levels after exposure to casein, a dietary antigen, in Mexican Americans. The rs1455782 SNP was linked to decreased forced vital capacity, which is a measure of pulmonary function. The rs12148722 SNP was mildly associated with velopharyngeal dysfunction. A haplotype block within C15orf32 was associated with acute myeloid leukemia. A deletion in 15q26.1 including genes ST8SIA2, C15orf32, and FAM174B was found in a patient with epilepsy and autism spectrum disorder.

Homology 
Homologs of C15orf32 have been described in 39 other mammals. No known orthologs exist outside of mammals.

References